The High Commissioner of Australia to Samoa is an officer of the Australian Department of Foreign Affairs and Trade and the head of the High Commission of the Commonwealth of Australia in Apia, Samoa (formerly known as Western Samoa until 4 July 1997). The position has the rank and status of an Ambassador Extraordinary and Plenipotentiary and the High Commissioner is also responsible for relations with American Samoa, an unincorporated territory of the United States. The current high commissioner since June 2021 is Emily Luck.

Posting history
On 13 December 1970, the Australian High Commissioner in Suva, Fiji, Robert Birch, was appointed as the non-resident accredited High Commissioner to Western Samoa,  and accreditation was held by the high commissioners in Suva until September 1977. On 23 March 1977, during a visit of Samoan prime minister Tui Ātua Tupua Tamasese Efi to Australia, Prime Minister Malcolm Fraser announced the establishment of an Australian High Commission in Apia, with an acting high commissioner appointed on 20 September 1977 to hold office until the appointment of a resident high commissioner, which was achieved in October 1979.

Heads of mission

References

External links

Australian High Commission, Independent State of Samoa

Samoa
 
Australia